Boynton is a surname. Notable people with the surname include:

 Benny Boynton (1898–1963), early National Football League player and member of the College Football Hall of Fame
 Charles Lawrence Boynton (1864–1943), American botanist
 Sir Engleram Boynton (c. 1190–1250), served in the First Barons' War (Magna Charta). His descendants include Sir Matthew Boynton, 1st Baronet .
 Florence Treadwell Boynton (1876-1962), American dance educator and lecturer 
 Frank Ellis Boynton (1859–1942), self-taught American botanist, possibly the brother of Charles Boynton
 Henry V. Boynton (1835–1905), American Civil War Medal of Honor recipient, eventually promoted to brigadier general
 Jack Boynton (1928–2010), American Contemporary Surrealist artist
 James S. Boynton (1833–1902), American politician and jurist
 John F. Boynton (1811–1890), an early leader in the Latter Day Saint movement and an American geologist and inventor
 Lucy Boynton (born 1994), English actress
 Nick Boynton (born 1979), Canadian National Hockey League player
 Peter Boynton (born 1957), Commissioner of the Connecticut Department of Emergency Management and Homeland Security
 Ruth Boynton (1896–1977) was a physician, researcher, and administrator
 Sandra Boynton (born 1953), children's author and illustrator
 Thomas Jefferson Boynton (1838–1871), American lawyer, journalist and judge
 Captain Joseph Boynton (1644–1730), served as an officer in the colonial American army in Queen Anne's War . He was the son of John Boynton who arrived in America on the John of London (ship) and was an original settler of Rowley, MA. 
 Solomon Boynton (1754–1830), great grandson of Captain Joseph Boynton, served in the American army in the Battle of Chelsea Creek and the Battle of White Plains during the American Revolutionary War.   
 Silas W. Boynton (1848–1907), great grandson of Solomon Boynton, served in Company K of the 1st Cavalry Regiment of the Union Army in the US Civil War.
 William Boynton (astronomer), head of The University of Arizona's Lunar and Planetary Laboratory
 William Boynton (1641– 1689), English Member of Parliament.

References

Welsh-language surnames